Tidningar Utgifne Af et Sällskap i Åbo was a newspaper that was first published in Finland in 1771, the first newspaper to be published in Finland. Finland was under Swedish rule at that time, and the newspaper was published in the Swedish language. It was in circulation until 1785.

References

Newspapers established in 1771
Publications disestablished in 1785
Defunct newspapers published in Finland
Swedish-language newspapers published in Finland
Mass media in Turku